Bela Papp (born 9 March 1994) is a Finnish figure skater. He is the 2011 Finnish national champion. Selected to compete at four consecutive World Junior Championships, he qualified twice for the free skate. Papp also competed at various different Junior Grand Prix events as well as represented Finland at two consecutive University Games (Universiade). Papp has won the Finnish title in all of the categories and was the youngest man to win the Senior title at the age of 16.

Personal life
Bela Papp was born on 9 March 1994 in Kuopio, Finland. His mother, Ulla, is a figure skating coach, and his siblings—Beata, Bettina, Benjam—have all competed in the sport. His American-born father is of Hungarian descent and had moved to Finland when he was five years old. He relocated to British Columbia, Canada in July 2007. As of 2014, he is a student at Simon Fraser University. Papp is currently a masters degree student at the University of Jyväskylä.

Career
In the 2007–08 season, Papp was sent to Lake Placid, New York to compete at his first ISU Junior Grand Prix event. After winning the Finnish national junior title, he was assigned to the 2008 World Junior Championships in Sofia, Bulgaria but did not qualify for the free skate. The following season, Papp repeated as the Finnish junior champion. He was eliminated before the free skate again at the 2009 World Junior Championships but was successful at the 2010 World Junior Championships in The Hague, Netherlands, where he finished 24th.

In the 2010–11 season, Papp won the Finnish national title on the senior level. He was assigned to the 2011 World Junior Championships in Gangneung, South Korea, where he placed 22nd, and the 2011 World Championships in Moscow, where he was eliminated after the preliminary round. Surgery on the L5 bilateral pars in his lower back kept him out of competition in the 2012–13 season.

Programs

Competitive highlights 
CS: Challenger Series; JGP: Junior Grand Prix

References

External links 

 

1994 births
Finnish male single skaters
Living people
People from Kuopio
Finnish expatriate sportspeople in Canada
Finnish people of Hungarian descent
Finnish people of American descent
Competitors at the 2015 Winter Universiade
Competitors at the 2017 Winter Universiade
Sportspeople from North Savo